Hayesville is a census-designated place and unincorporated community in Marion County, Oregon, United States, just outside the city limits of Salem but within the city's urban growth boundary. It is part of the Salem Metropolitan Statistical Area. For statistical purposes, the United States Census Bureau has defined Hayesville as a census-designated place (CDP). The census definition of the area may not precisely correspond to local understanding of the area with the same name. The population of the CDP was 21,891 at the 2020 census.

Hayesville is the home of Chemeketa Community College's main campus.

Geography

Demographics

As of the census of 2000, there were 18,222 people, 6,655 households, and 4,631 families residing in the CDP. The population density was 4,635.7 people per square mile (1,790.2/km2). There were 6,951 housing units at an average density of 1,768.3/sq mi (682.9/km2). The racial makeup of the CDP was 76.81% White, 0.95% African American, 1.72% Native American, 3.50% Asian, 0.71% Pacific Islander, 12.50% from other races, and 3.81% from two or more races. Hispanic or Latino of any race were 19.76% of the population.

There were 6,655 households, out of which 35.6% had children under the age of 18 living with them, 51.9% were married couples living together, 12.5% had a female householder with no husband present, and 30.4% were non-families. 21.7% of all households were made up of individuals, and 6.4% had someone living alone who was 65 years of age or older. The average household size was 2.71 and the average family size was 3.15.

In the CDP, the population was spread out, with 27.7% under the age of 18, 12.4% from 18 to 24, 28.3% from 25 to 44, 21.3% from 45 to 64, and 10.3% who were 65 years of age or older. The median age was 31 years. For every 100 females, there were 100.4 males. For every 100 females age 18 and over, there were 96.5 males.

The median income for a household in the CDP was $35,673, and the median income for a family was $40,781. Males had a median income of $33,920 versus $26,969 for females. The per capita income for the CDP was $17,673. About 12.8% of families and 15.3% of the population were below the poverty line, including 20.5% of those under age 18 and 7.2% of those age 65 or over.

References

External links
History of Hayesville

Census-designated places in Oregon
Salem, Oregon metropolitan area
Unincorporated communities in Marion County, Oregon
Census-designated places in Marion County, Oregon
Unincorporated communities in Oregon